Glovers Harbour, formerly known as Thimble Tickle(s), is an unincorporated community and harbour in the Canadian province of Newfoundland and Labrador. It is located in Notre Dame Bay on the northern coast of the island of Newfoundland. As a local service district, it is led by an elected committee that is responsible for the delivery of certain essential services. It is delineated as a designated place for statistical purposes.

Settled sometime in the second half of the 19th century, Glovers Harbour has remained primarily a fishing village throughout its history. It is best known for the giant squid that was captured on its shores in 1878, which was subsequently recognised as a world record by Guinness. Glovers Harbour brands itself as the "home of the giant squid" and has a small heritage centre and "life-sized" sculpture dedicated to the animal, these being its main tourist attractions.

History 
The settlement was named after John Hawley Glover, who served as the Governor of Newfoundland in 1876–1881 and again in 1883–1885.

Early years
According to local tradition, Glovers Harbour was founded by Joseph Martin, originally of Harbour Grace, who settled there sometime in the late 1800s. Martin's daughter married the son of George Marsh, the first permanent settler of nearby Winter House Cove, and the two families remained the main inhabitants of Glovers Harbour until the arrival of Alex Boone, previously of Cottrell's Cove.

Glovers Harbour first appeared in the Canadian national census of 1901, under the name Glover Harbor, when its population was recorded as 67, though this included the inhabitants of Leading Tickles and Lock's Harbour (later Lockesport(e) or Lockport). In the 1911 census, it was listed as Glover's Harbor, with a population of 28 Newfoundland-born residents, predominantly followers of the Church of England, though one Methodist was also recorded. The population fell to a low of 11 at the time of the 1921 census but rebounded to 29 in 1935 and 38 in 1945.

Resettlement period 
From its founding, small-scale inshore cod fishing was the mainstay of the local economy, supplemented by seasonal work such as logging as well as livestock and vegetable farming. By the middle of the 20th century, however, a lack of transport infrastructure left the isolated residents of Glovers Harbour with few other job opportunities. The 1962 construction of a road connecting Glovers Harbour to Route 350 was transformative, as it opened access to the commercially important town of Botwood and to the nearby fish markets of Leading Tickles and Point Leamington. Movement of people from more isolated nearby communities to Glovers Harbour soon followed, largely motivated by a Newfoundland-wide government resettlement program, though some early moves occurred without government assistance.

Despite being larger at the time, the neighbouring communities of Lockesporte and Winter House Cove (both located in Seal Bay) were never connected to the road network owing to the difficulty of the surrounding terrain, and this contributed to their rapid decline and eventual abandonment by the close of the 1960s. As recorded in the 1971 census, eight families totalling 39 people (predominantly with the surname Haggett) had moved to Glovers Harbour from Lockesporte alone. At least four families (Burton, followed by Goudie, Haggett, and Rowsell) had similarly resettled from Winter House Cove by this point. As a result, the population of Glovers Harbour swelled almost threefold between 1966 and 1971, from 52 to 145.

The concomitant demographic changes turned Glovers Harbour into "a predominantly Salvation Army community". The village's first Salvation Army citadel—which also served Lockesporte, Ward's Point, and Winter House Cove, and doubled up as a school—was erected on land belonging to Electra Martin. This was followed by a second citadel, originally constructed near Flag Pond around 1942, that was later moved close to Glovers Harbour Road.

During resettlement, Winter House Cove's Anglican church—a school chapel first recorded in the 1901 census—was floated (transported over water) to Glovers Harbour, where it found use as a school until the late 1960s. Both this school and another one that had been built in Glovers Harbour by the 1960s were later closed; thereafter, students attended elementary school in Leading Tickles and high school in Point Leamington, which were reached by school bus. The Anglican church was subsequently renovated and held fortnightly services presided over by a visiting minister from Botwood.

From its peak following resettlement, the population of Glovers Harbour dropped to 136 by 1981 and continued to gradually contract over the next three decades.

Contemporary history 
Over time, the fishery in Glovers Harbour has diversified to encompass lobster, capelin, squid, and queen crab (also known as snow crab). In 1997, a proposal was submitted to recognise the coastal area around Leading Tickles and Glovers Harbour as a Marine Protected Area (MPA). On 8 June 2001, the area officially came under consideration to become an MPA when it was identified as an Area of Interest by the minister for the Department of Fisheries and Oceans (DFO).

Geography 
Glovers Harbour is in Newfoundland within Subdivision E of Division No. 8.

A promontory on the southern shore of Glovers Harbour is known as Glovers Point. Glovers Harbour also gives its name to the Glovers Harbour Formation, a sequence of volcanic rocks of the Wild Bight Group that lie to its west. Other geographical points of interest include an unmarked trail called Rowsell's Trail.

Glovers Harbour is surrounded "by rolling green hillsides and glacial lakes, making it incredibly picturesque for those who have never visited Newfoundland before".

Thimble Tickle 
Glovers Harbour was formerly known as Thimble Tickle(s). In Newfoundland English, a tickle is a narrow strait (see List of tickles). The name Thimble Tickle (and variants thereof) has been applied to a number of related geographical features. The Gazetteer of Canada of 1968 lists Thimble Tickles (a series of channels), Thimble Head, and Thimble Tickle Head (both headlands) as features in the same general area. Other associated geographical names include Cumlins Cove and Cumlins Head, both listed by the Gazetteer as features of Thimble Tickle(s). According to the Encyclopedia of Newfoundland and Labrador, Thimble Tickles is a "scattered group of islands" in the vicinity of Glovers Harbour. It has also been described as "a passage between several islands south of Leading Tickles and a few kilometres north of Glovers Harbour".

Thimble Tickle Prospect, also known as the Lockport Mine (after Lockport), was a copper and sulfur mine located "over the hill" and just west of Glovers Harbour. It operated intermittently in the 1880s and 1890s; the shafts were sealed around 1999.

Demographics 

The 2016 census recorded a median value of dwellings of CA$100,161 (equivalent to US$ in ). The median total household income was CA$61,824 (equivalent to US$ in ).

Governance 
Glovers Harbour is a local service district (LSD) that is governed by a committee responsible for the provision of certain services to the community. The chair of the LSD committee is Ida Haggett.

Giant squid

Thimble Tickle specimen

Glovers Harbour is best known for its association with the giant squid (Architeuthis dux). It was secured to a tree with a grapnel and rope and died as the tide receded. No parts of the animal were saved and no photographs or exact measurements exist as the specimen was cut up for dog food soon after its discovery; practically all that is known of it comes from a second-hand account by Reverend Moses Harvey in a letter to the Boston Traveller dated 30 January 1879, which was reproduced in the works of Yale zoologist Addison Emery Verrill the following year:

On the 2d day of November last, Stephen Sherring, a fisherman residing in Thimble Tickle, not far from the locality where the other devil-fish [the "Three Arms specimen"], was cast ashore, was out in a boat with two other men; not far from the shore they observed some bulky object, and, supposing it might be part of a wreck, they rowed toward it, and, to their horror, found themselves close to a huge fish, having large glassy eyes, which was making desperate efforts to escape, and churning the water into foam by the motion of its immense arms and tail. It was aground and the tide was ebbing. From the funnel at the back of its head it was ejecting large volumes of water, this being its method of moving backward, the force of the stream, by the reaction of the surrounding medium, driving it in the required direction. At times the water from the siphon was black as ink.

Finding the monster partially disabled, the fishermen plucked up courage and ventured near enough to throw the grapnel of their boat, the sharp flukes of which, having barbed points, sunk into the soft body. To the grapnel they had attached a stout rope which they had carried ashore and tied to a tree, so as to prevent the fish from going out with the tide. It was a happy thought, for the devil fish found himself effectually moored to the shore. His struggles were terrific as he flung his ten arms about in dying agony. The fishermen took care to keep a respectful distance from the long tentacles, which ever and anon darted out like great tongues from the central mass. At length it became exhausted, and as the water receded it expired.

The fishermen, alas! knowing no better, proceeded to convert it into dog's meat. It was a splendid specimen—the largest yet taken—the body measuring 20 feet [] from the beak to the extremity of the tail. It was thus exactly double the size of the New York specimen [better known as the "Catalina specimen"], and five feet [] longer than the one taken by [fisherman William] Budgell [the "Three Arms specimen"]. The circumference of the body is not stated, but one of the arms measured 35 feet []. This must have been a tentacle.

Though the original account mentions only Stephen Sherring and two other (unnamed) fishermen, later sources identify Glovers Harbour's founder, Joseph Martin, as one of the fishermen involved in the squid's capture. George Marsh and Henry Rowsell—the founders of Winter House Cove and Lock's Harbour (Lockesporte), respectively—have also been suggested as participants. The fishermen may have learned of Moses Harvey's interest in the giant squid when the latter visited Notre Dame Bay only a couple of months earlier, in August 1878, as part of a geological survey. A CBC News report broadcast in 2004 features Maurice Martin, great-great-grandson of Joseph Martin, recounting the story of the squid's capture as told to him by his grandfather.

The "Thimble Tickle specimen" has long been recognised by Guinness World Records and its prior incarnations as the largest giant squid ever recorded. Such lengths are now generally regarded as exaggerations and often attributed to artificial lengthening of the two long feeding tentacles (analogous to stretching elastic bands) or to inadequate measurement methods such as pacing. Additionally, a number of extreme mass estimates have been published for the specimen.

Giant Squid Interpretation Site 
Today, a small heritage centre and a "life-sized", 55-foot giant squid sculpture—collectively known as the Giant Squid Interpretation Site—stand near the site of the specimen's capture and are the community's main tourist attractions. The sculpture was completed in 2001 following a CA$100,000 government contribution (equivalent to US$ in ); ten thousand visitors were expected in the first year. It weighs four tonnes and was constructed from a combination of steel, wire mesh, and concrete. The sculpture was designed by fine arts teacher Don Foulds of Saskatoon and built by him and his students, with help from Jason Hussey, Niel McLellan, and Edward O'Neill. It has been described as "a beautiful reproduction" by Spanish giant squid experts. The sculpture featured on a Canada Post stamp issued in 2011 as part of the "Roadside Attractions" series, with a print run of 1,045,000.

The heritage centre opened in 2009 and includes a small museum, a gift shop, and a picnic area. The museum details the capture of the Thimble Tickle specimen—including among its collections the "official records of the encounter" and a "life-sized" replica of the squid's eyeball—but also the history of the local area and particularly its fishing heritage.

See also 
List of communities in Newfoundland and Labrador
List of designated places in Newfoundland and Labrador
List of local service districts in Newfoundland and Labrador
Museo del Calamar Gigante – giant squid museum in Luarca, Spain
Noto, Ishikawa – Japanese town with large squid statue as tourist attraction

Notes

References

Further reading 
 Anon. (2000). Salute to Newfoundland communities: Glovers Harbour. The Newfoundland Herald vol. 55, no. 8.
 Carberry, N. (2001). Giant squid makes second landing in Glovers Harbour. Advertiser (Grand Falls) vol. 65, no. 63.
 Glover's Harbour: New Cemetery. Newfoundland's Grand Banks.

External links 

 
 
 
 Giant Squid Interpretation Site – Adventure Central Newfoundland

Designated places in Newfoundland and Labrador
Local service districts in Newfoundland and Labrador
Populated coastal places in Canada
Bays of Newfoundland and Labrador
Giant squid